The Mexican Academy of Language divides its members into several categories: numerarios ("full"), honorarios ("honorary") and correspondientes ("correspondent").

Director
The academy's 15th and current director is Dr. José G. Moreno de Alba.

Full members
The Académicos de número of the Mexican Academy are, in order of seniority:

José Luis Martínez 
Miguel León-Portilla
Andrés Henestrosa†
Alí Chumacero
Ernesto de la Torre Villar
Silvio Zavala
José G. Moreno de Alba (director)
José Pascual Buxó
Clementina Díaz y de Ovando
Tarsicio Herrera Zapién
Carlos Montemayor
Arturo Azuela
Leopoldo Solís
Ruy Pérez Tamayo (assistant director)
José Rogelio Álvarez
Guido Gómez de Silva
Eulalio Ferrer Rodríguez
Ernesto de la Peña
Margit Frenk
Ramón Xirau
Gonzalo Celorio (secretary)
Margo Glantz
Enrique Cárdenas de la Peña
Jaime Labastida (treasurer)
Mauricio Beuchot
Gustavo Couttolenc
Elías Trabulse
Vicente Quirarte (librarian/archivist)
Julieta Fierro
Felipe Garrido
Adolfo Castañón
Diego Valadés
Concepción Company Company
Agustín Basave Fernández del Valle
Fernando Serrano Migallón
Patrick Johansson Kéraudren
Yolanda Lastra
Rosa Beltrán
Angelina Muñiz-Huberman (2021)

Honorary members
The Académicos Honorarios  have included: 
Mexican
 Antonio Alatorre
 Carlos Fuentes
 José Justo Gómez de la Cortina
 Alfonso Herrera
 Octavio Paz
Foreign
 Dámaso Alonso
 Germán Arciniegas
 Samuel Arguedas
 Miguel Antonio Caro
 Rufino José Cuervo
 Atilio Dell'Oro Maini
 Laureano García Ortiz
 Antonio Gómez Restrepo
 Lorenzo Marroquín
 Luis Eduardo Nieto Caballero
 Salomón de la Selva
 Gutierre Tibón
 Aurelio Tió

Correspondent members
Notable académicos correspondientes have included:
Miguel Alessio Robles, Salvador Díaz Mirón, Genaro Estrada, Pablo González Casanova, Luis González y González, José Gorostiza, Francisco de Icaza, Amado Nervo, Manuel José Othón, Manuel Payno, Sergio Pitol, Vicente Riva Palacio, Luis G. Urbina, and Felipe San José y González and Natalio Hernández.

References